KPGG (103.9 FM, "103.9 The Pig") is a radio station broadcasting a classic country music format. Licensed to Ashdown, Arkansas, United States, it serves the Texarkana area. The station is currently owned by American Media Investments, Inc.  Studios are located on College Drive in Texarkana, Texas and its transmitter is in Ogden, Arkansas.

Broadcast personalities include Michael B, Doug Davis, Fabienne Thrash, Brad Ford, and "Milam". Additional weekly programming on the station includes the "Wake Up Call" with Michael B & Doug Davis, Fabe's Lunchtime Requests, "Roots of Country" with Doug Davis, "Sunday's Kind of Country", and "God's Country", featuring gospel music by classic country artists.

Station management: Kirk Keller

Rebranding as "The Pig"
On February 4, 2019, KPGG rebranded as "98.5 & 103.9 The Pig", adding a simulcast on KHDY-FM 98.5 FM Clarksville, Texas).

References

External links
KPGG-FM Official website

Classic country radio stations in the United States
PGG
Radio stations established in 1972
1972 establishments in Arkansas